Draxler is a surname.

It may refer to:

 Jack Draxler, American politician
 Jesse Draxler (born 1983), American visual artist
 Judith Draxler (born 1970), Austrian retired freestyle swimmer
 Julian Draxler (born 1993), German footballer
 Ludwig Draxler (1896–1972), Austrian attorney and politician

German-language surnames